The Symons Gold Medal is awarded biennially by the Royal Meteorological Society for distinguished work in the field of meteorological science.

It was established in 1901 in memory of George James Symons, a notable British meteorologist.

Recipients
Source (1978-): Royal Metereological Society

See also

 List of meteorology awards
 List of prizes named after people

References

Meteorology awards
British awards
Awards established in 1901